Xylitol pentanitrate (XPN) is a nitrated ester primary explosive first synthesized in 1891 by Gabriel Bertrand. Law enforcement has taken an interest in XPN along with erythritol tetranitrate (ETN) and pentaerythritol tetranitrate (PETN) due to their ease of synthesis, which makes them accessible to amateur chemists and terrorists.

Properties 
At room temperature XPN exists as a white crystalline solid. When heated to 163 °C, liquid xylitol pentanitrate begins to crackle and produce a dark vapour. When decomposed, every gram of XPN produces 200 mL of gas, which makes it a high performance explosive.

Rotter impact analysis of XPN found a figure of insensitiveness of 25 (RDX = 80). XPN displayed a similar sensitivity to electric static discharge to ETN and PETN.

Synthesis 
Xylitol pentanitrate is formed by reaction of xylitol pentaacetate with fuming nitric acid and glacial acetic acid.

Complete oxidation 
Much like ETN, XPN has a positive oxygen balance, which means the carbon and oxygen in the molecule can be fully oxidized without another oxidizing agent being added. 4C5H7N5O15 ->[\Delta] 20CO2 + 14H2O + 10N2 + 3O2

The decomposition of four molecules of XPN releases three O2. The free oxygen molecules can be used to oxidize an added metal dust or negative oxygen balanced explosive like TNT.

See also 
 Nitroglycerine
 Xylitan trinitrate ([(2R,3S,4S)-3,4-dinitrooxyoxolan-2-yl]methyl nitrate) – used as plasticizer in propellants similarly to nitroglycerine
 Mannitol hexanitrate

Explosive chemicals
Nitrate esters
Sugar alcohol explosives

References

External links